Orthotheca is a genus of sessile bottom-dwelling hyolith.

References

 
Prehistoric protostome genera
Paleozoic invertebrates
Cambrian first appearances
Early Devonian genus extinctions